Prabhas, is an Indian actor who works predominantly in Telugu cinema. One of the highest-paid actors in Indian cinema, Prabhas has featured in Forbes Indias Celebrity 100 list three times since 2015 based on his income and popularity. He has received seven Filmfare Awards South nominations and is a recipient of the Nandi Award and the SIIMA Award.

Prabhas made his acting debut with the 2002 Telugu drama Eeswar, and later attained his breakthrough with the romantic action film Varsham (2004). His notable works include Chatrapathi (2005), Bujjigadu (2008), Billa (2009), Darling (2010), Mr. Perfect (2011), and Mirchi (2013). He won the state Nandi Award for Best Actor for his performance in Mirchi. In 2015, Prabhas starred in the title role in S. S. Rajamouli's epic action film Baahubali: The Beginning, which is the fourth-highest-grossing Indian film to date. He later reprised his role in its sequel, Baahubali 2: The Conclusion (2017), which became the first Indian film ever to gross over 1,000 crore (US$155 million) in all languages in just ten days, and is the second highest-grossing Indian film to date. 

Prabhas next two films Saaho and Radhe Shyam both ended up as flop in the box office.

Currently Prabhas is filming 3 films - Salaar, Project K, and an untitled movie with Maruthi tentatively titled Raja Deluxe and with one movie in Post Production - Adipurush. Prabhas is also set to star in Vanga's Spirit and Siddharth Anand's Untitled Action Thriller movie and also in Neel's Ravanam.

In addition to acting in films, Prabhas is also the brand ambassador for the Mahindra TUV300. He is the first Telugu actor to receive a wax sculpture at Madame Tussaud's wax museum.

Film

Awards

References 

Indian filmographies
Male actor filmographies
Lists of awards received by Indian actor